Essaouira-Mogador Airport  is an international airport serving Essaouira (formerly known as Mogador), a city in the Marrakesh-Safi region in Morocco.

Facilities

Airlines and destinations
The following airlines operate regular scheduled and charter flights at Essaouira Airport:

Statistics

References

External links
 

Airports in Morocco
Buildings and structures in Marrakesh-Safi